The Anti-Football League is an Australian organisation that pokes fun at the obsession with Australian rules football. It was founded by Melbourne journalist Keith Dunstan in 1967.

Origins
The Anti-Football League was created in response to a remark made by journalist Douglas Wilkie in the offices of The Sun News-Pictorial on Sunday 16 April 1967. On that day, the building was filled with sports writers and ex-footballers – along with their ghost writers – preparing the Monday edition of the football round-up for the weekend. Amongst the relentless discussions pertaining to football, Wilkie, the Suns foreign correspondent made a remark to Dunstan that he had had enough. "There must be a better life than this. Couldn't we start an anti-football organisation?"

Dunstan suggested that a badge should be devised, so that League members could recognise each other and intelligent non-football discussion could take place. The badge was to be in the shape of a red cube, symbolic of an object that would not bounce. The firm of K.G. Luke and Company – which was chaired by Sir Kenneth Luke, the president of the Victorian Football League – volunteered to make the badges, and by July 1967, 5,600 of them had been sold.

The Anti-Football League was known unambiguously as the AFL when it was established. This became ambiguous in 1990, when the Victorian Football League changed its name to the Australian Football League.

Wilkie Award
The Douglas Wilkie Medal was established as the Anti-Football League's answer to the Brownlow Medal. Wilkie was a former war correspondent and much admired columnist on The Sun, specialising in political and social commentary. Each year the Wilkie Medal honours the person who has done the least for football in the best and fairest manner. Past winners have included former Prime Minister Harold Holt, satirist Barry Humphries (once as himself and once in his Les Patterson comic persona), Olympic champion Raelene Boyle and comedian Wendy Harmer. The award is presented on Anti-Football day, and the recipient is expected to destroy a football in a unique and creative manner to show their allegiance to the cause. Barry Humphries would later go on to perform in his stage persona Dame Edna Everage during an AFL Grand Final pre match, drawing criticism from the organisation for hypocrisy.

Re-formation
The organisation's website was launched in 2006, giving new impetus to the organisation. In an article in the Australian newspaper Herald Sun, published on 12 May 2007, Dunstan is quoted as declaring "the AFL is back" after a hiatus of 10 years. He cited recent behaviour of the players as a reason to start the League again. Along with the league re-forming, the Douglas Wilkie Medal was awarded for the first time since 1994.

In 2008 the organisation announced the Newman Award to be "presented to a footballer who displays the worst off-field performance, in the preceding 12 months." Sam Newman is among those nominated for the inaugural award. The organisation also holds an Anti Grand Final Day Lunch' to celebrate the end of the football season and the return to more civilised pursuits. No mention of football is allowed with the penalty being eviction from the lunch.

References

External links

Australian rules football culture
Organizations established in 1967
Sports organisations of Australia
1967 establishments in Australia